Kathy Fagan Grandinetti is an American poet.

Biography
Kathy Fagan earned a B.A. in English from California State University, Fresno in 1980. She holds an M.F.A. from Columbia University and a Ph.D. from the University of Utah. She teaches at Ohio State University. Her poems have appeared in AGNI, The Paris Review, FIELD, The Kenyon Review, Slate, Ploughshares, The New Republic, Shenandoah, The Missouri Review, and elsewhere.

Awards
 National Endowment for the Arts Fellowship
 Ingram Merrill Foundation Fellowship
 Ohio Arts Council Fellowship
 2018 Shortlisted for the Kingsley Tufts Poetry Award and William Carlos Williams Award,
 2017 Ohio Poet of the Year
 2017 Raymond J. Hanley Award
 2004 Ohioana Award for Editorial Excellence.
 1998 Vassar Miller Prize for Poetry, for Moving & St Rage
 1985 The Frost Place poet in residence
 1984 National Poetry Series Award, for The Raft

Works

Anthologies

References

External links
 

Year of birth missing (living people)
Living people
California State University, Fresno alumni
Columbia University School of the Arts alumni
University of Utah alumni
Ohio State University faculty
American women poets
American women academics
21st-century American women